Les Bordes-sur-Lez is a former commune in the Ariège department of southwestern France. On 1 January 2017, it was merged into the new commune Bordes-Uchentein.

Population
Inhabitants of Les Bordes-sur-Lez are called Bordelais.

See also
Communes of the Ariège department

References

Former communes of Ariège (department)
Ariège communes articles needing translation from French Wikipedia
Populated places disestablished in 2017